Explore2fs is an Explorer-like program for Microsoft Windows that is capable of reading ext2 and ext3 (Linux) hard disk partitions.  This can be especially convenient if one has a dual-boot system
with both Linux and Windows partitions, or if one uses a live-CD version of Linux that creates
an ext2 partition image as a single file on an NTFS drive (such as Puppy Linux, for
instance, does). It is licensed under the GPLv2.

A new version called Virtual Volumes is being developed.  This new version has a layered modular design. It supports multiple filesystems and multiple disk access methods.

Filesystems
 ext2
 ext3
 reiserfs
 win32 API
 sftp

Block devices
 win32 API
 NT Native API
 XP Volumes
 Windows 95 (INT13 DPMI)
 LVM2
 Software RAID

External links

Explore2fs website

Utilities for Windows